"Mixed Emotions" is a song by English rock band the Rolling Stones from their 1989 album, Steel Wheels. Written by Mick Jagger and Keith Richards while on vacation in Barbados, "Mixed Emotions" was a heavy collaborative effort between Jagger and Richards. Richards brought his own music to the sessions along with most of the song's lyrics, the rest being filled in by Jagger in the studio. Released on 21 August 1989 in the United Kingdom, the song reached  1 in Canada and No. 5 in the United States while becoming a top-ten hit in Finland, the Netherlands, New Zealand and Norway. To date, it was the band's final Billboard Top Ten hit.

Recording
The song is an upfront rocker, with Richards, Jagger and Ronnie Wood sharing guitar duties. Piano and organ were provided by Chuck Leavell, the Stones' touring keyboardist since the 1980s. Backing vocals are provided by Jagger, Richards, Sarah Dash, Lisa Fischer, and Bernard Fowler, the latter two longtime touring vocalists for the Stones. Brass was provided by the Kick Horns while Luis Jardim provided percussion. Charlie Watts handled drums while Bill Wyman played bass.

Music video
To match the upbeat nature of the song, the music video featured the Stones, playful and smiling, performing the song as well as recording it. This stands in stark contrast to the band's previous video, 1986's "One Hit (to the Body)," filmed during a time when relations between Jagger and Richards were at an all-time low, and which featured uncomfortable physical sparring between the two.

Release
Released as the album's first single on 21 August 1989, "Mixed Emotions" made it into the top 10 in the US, going to number five, and was also a number-one hit on the Album Rock Tracks chart for five weeks and in Canada for one week. This is the Stones' last US top-ten single thus far, although they would go on to have more chart hits on the Album Rock Tracks (now Mainstream Rock) chart. The single's B-side was "Fancy Man Blues", a non-album track recorded during the Steel Wheels sessions.

The song was regularly performed during the 1989-1990 Steel Wheels/Urban Jungle Tour and is included on the live albums Live at The Tokyo Dome and Steel Wheels Live.

"Mixed Emotions" appears on all latter day compilations, including Jump Back, Forty Licks and GRRR!.

The 12-inch remix of "Mixed Emotions" by producer Chris Kimsey was rereleased on the Rarities 1971–2003 compilation, in 2005, along with "Fancy Man Blues."

Track listing
 "Mixed Emotions" (7-inch version) – 4:00
 "Mixed Emotions" (Chris Kimsey's 12-inch) – 6:10
 "Fancy Man Blues" – 4:54

Charts

Weekly charts

Year-end charts

References

External links
  Rolling Stones Mixed Emotions CBS 7655193 Holland

The Rolling Stones songs
1989 songs
1989 singles
RPM Top Singles number-one singles
Song recordings produced by Chris Kimsey
Song recordings produced by Jagger–Richards
Songs written by Jagger–Richards